Leon Samuel Snider (1897 – 9 August 1965) was an Australian politician.

He was born in Melbourne to Polish immigrant fruit merchant Phillip Snider and Diare Rachel Pahl. He attended Scotch College and became a theatre proprietor, moving to Sydney in 1925. On 15 May 1930 he married Ruth Cohen, with whom he had three children. He was a partner in the film distribution company Snider and Dean, and also served on Woollahra Council from 1935 to 1948 (mayor in 1944). From 1943 to 1965 he was a member of the New South Wales Legislative Council, first as a member of the Liberal Party and from 1959 as a Country Party member. Snider died in Sydney in 1965.

References

1897 births
1965 deaths
Liberal Party of Australia members of the Parliament of New South Wales
National Party of Australia members of the Parliament of New South Wales
Members of the New South Wales Legislative Council
20th-century Australian politicians
Mayors of Woollahra